The Oppo Neo is the first phone in Oppo's Neo series. The phone was sold in two colors: white and black, for a price of €160.

References 

Oppo smartphones
Android (operating system) devices
Discontinued smartphones
Mobile phones with user-replaceable battery